Georg (Albert Julius) Krause (1858 – 7 February 1915) was a Silesian-German oologist and bookseller from Hirschberg. He illustrated and published a book on the eggs of palearctic birds. Among his significant collections were eggs of the now-extinct Aepyornis.

Biography

Krause was born in Glogau and became a collector of eggs from childhoold. He later lived in Hirschberg, Silesia. In 1900 he was in charge of the natural and geological collections at the Karkonosze Museum in Jelenia Góra. In 1901 he published a pamphlet on the anatomical structure of the ear of birds. In 1905 he became a curator at the Zoological Museum in Berlin and published the Oologia universalis palaearctica from 1906 to 1913 in 78 fascicles (out of a projected 150) with (quarto) plates made from his own illustrations of eggs.

In 1914 he was concerned by the collection of tern's eggs, especially those of Sandwich tern, being used in large numbers in the Berlin chocolate industry for the production of Easter eggs. His note, with his address at Pankow, Berlin, on the topic was published posthumously in 1919.

References

External links 
 Partial scan of Oologia universalis palaearctica

1858 births
1915 deaths
Oologists
German ornithologists